Myles Stoddard (born January 7, 1977) is a former American soccer player.

Career statistics

Club

Notes

References

1977 births
Living people
American soccer players
United States men's youth international soccer players
Association football forwards
Reno Rattlers players
Nashville Metros players
Utah Freezz players
Cleveland Crunch players
California Cougars players
A-League (1995–2004) players
World Indoor Soccer League players
Major Indoor Soccer League (2001–2008) players